MuckFest is a mud and obstacle 5K run series designed by special effects and event production specialists from Hollywood, with donations raised going to the National Multiple Sclerosis Society. The MuckFest event culture and course emphasize a blend of athleticism and adventure running with 15+ obstacles with names like Big Balls, Mt. Muck-imanjaro and Muck Off. It is positioned as an alternative to some of the other mud runs that are based on pain and endurance.

Production team and charity partner 
MuckFest is produced by Event 360, Inc. in partnership with the National Multiple Sclerosis Society. Event 360 is based in Chicago and Los Angeles and is most well known for producing the long-running Susan G. Komen 3-Day for the Cure series. The donations raised by MuckFest participants go to the National MS Society, and participants have raised $30 million since the start of the event.

Event participants 
For MuckFest, runners are called "muckers." MuckFest attracts an almost even split of men and women across a broad range of age groups. The event is self-timed and the course and obstacles are designed to allow for a wide range of abilities, from top triathletes and marathoners to beginning athletes and groups from exercise boot camps and gyms. Because of its affiliation with National MS Society, every event includes runners who are living with multiple sclerosis, some of whom complete the course using a cane for stability.

Notable participants 
Former Jacksonville Jaguar Pete Mitchell led a team in the 2013 MuckFest Jacksonville and was one of the event's top fundraisers. Nicole "Snooki" Polizzi ran in the 2013 MuckFest New Jersey.

Featured obstacles on the 5K course 
 Big Balls – a signature obstacle, runners must navigate nine or more swinging balls (approximately 10 feet in diameter) suspended by cranes above four mud pits.
 Swing Set – runners catapult themselves into water from three steel-constructed swinging platforms that the runners stand on and rock to gain momentum.
 Mt. Muck-imanjaro – a rope-climbing, triangular steel structure more than 20 feet high.
 Walk on Water – runners run single-file and jump over round pontoons on a thin 80-foot runway that floats on top of the water.
 The Spinner – a self-propelled carousel-sized main structure with four cantilevered arms that carry runners, holding on by ropes, over a mud pit six to eight feet below. 
 Muck Off – runners jump or acrobatically flip off a wide steel platform eight feet above a deep pool.
 Spider Web – on the first pass, runners fight their way through mud and elastic cords impeding a clear path; on the second pass the runners climb linked ropes over the runners below.

2016 season and sites 

Site information adapted from the official website.

2015 season and sites

2014 season and sites

References 

Charity events in the United States
Multiple sclerosis organizations
Competitions in the United States